Connecticut's 66th House of Representatives district elects one member of the Connecticut House of Representatives. It consists of the towns of Bethlehem, Morris, Warren and parts of Woodbury and Litchfield. It has been represented by Republican David Wilson since 2017.

Recent elections

2020

2018

2016

2014

2012

References

66